Shanyang is a town in Jinshan District, Shanghai.

References

Towns in Shanghai